Samurai Shodown 64, known as  in Japan, is a 3D fighting game produced by SNK for its Hyper Neo-Geo 64 system. It was SNK's first 3D fighting game. After having released four Samurai Shodown games on the Neo-Geo, SNK announced that they would be producing a new arcade hardware platform, this one 64-bit and with extensive 3D capabilities. Although it was never ported to home consoles, it was followed by a second 3D installment titled Samurai Shodown 64: Warriors Rage.

Plot
Twenty years ago  a certain process was done over the years. Yuga would take out babies from their mother's wombs for a few days. She would put a certain spell on them and return them to the mother's womb. The baby would be born as if nothing happened. The child would show incredible talent in different fields. These children were called "Shindou" or "Kidou". Twenty years later, the children would become incredible adults who have a high status or are well known. Yuga would appear before these people and would show them a mysterious puppet show. This causes them to remember why they were born in this world and would follow orders given by Yuga.

Gameplay
The player can move in any direction, and the stages are multi-tiered. It is possible to knock an opponent through a wall or floor into a different section of the same arena, or out of the fighting area entirely, thus resulting in a victory by "ring out."

Each character has a "stamina bar" which decreases with excessive movement and attacks, and replenishes while inactive. There is also a "POW meter", which, once it reaches maximum, gives the player unlimited stamina for a period of time, and the ability to execute a super move.

The game introduced two new playable characters:

Yagyu Hanma, a muscular man with a metallic, gigantic arm
Shiki, a swordswoman proficient in fighting with dual katana, who is later chosen as one of SNK's selectable representatives in the fighting games SNK vs. Capcom: SVC Chaos and NeoGeo Battle Coliseum. She would also appear in Samurai Shodown (2019).

As in Samurai Shodown III, each character has "Slash" and "Bust" versions.

Development
The game was officially unveiled at the February 1997 AOU show, with a videotape containing a few seconds of footage of Samurai Shodown 64 serving as the first public demonstration of the Neo Geo 64. An 85% complete version was shown at the September 1997 JAMMA show.

Reception 
In Japan, Game Machine listed Samurai Shodown 64 on their February 15, 1998 issue as being the second most-successful arcade game of the month.

Super GamePower gave it 3/5.

References

External links

侍魂 ~SAMURAI SPIRITS~ at NeoGeo Battle Coliseum Museum 

1997 video games
Arcade video games
Arcade-only video games
Hyper Neogeo 64 games
Fighting games
3D fighting games
Samurai Shodown video games
SNK games
Video games about samurai
Video game sequels
Video games developed in Japan